The 1927–28 Lancashire Cup competition was the 20th competition in the  history of this regional rugby league event and the final was a repeat of the 1925–26 Lancashire Cup Final, with Swinton beating Wigan by 5-2. The match was played at Watersheddings, Oldham. The attendance was 22,000 and receipts £1,275.

Background 
The number of teams entering this year’s competition dropped back to 13 due to no amateur participation. This resulted in the competition running with 3 byes in the first round.

Competition and results

Round 1  
Involved  5 matches (with three byes) and 13 clubs

Round 2 – quarterfinals

Round 3 – semifinals

Final

Teams and scorers 

Scoring - Try = three (3) points - Goal = two (2) points - Drop goal = two (2) points

The road to success

See also 
1927–28 Northern Rugby Football League season

Notes 
 1 Watersheddings was the home ground of Oldham from 1889 to 1997. The ground, at one time, also housed a greyhound track.

References

RFL Lancashire Cup
Lancashire Cup